"I'm Your Pusher" is a 1988 single by American rapper Ice-T, from his second album Power. 

The song's lyrics recommend the use of music and dancing to feel good rather than using drugs: "The dope I'm selling you don't smoke / You feel out in the dance floor on my world tour / I'm selling dope in each and every record store".  However, the anti-drug theme was interpreted as having the opposite message, possibly as a result of misinterpretation of the context of the title, and ignorance as to the actual lyrical content.

The song was produced by Ice-T and Afrika Islam for Rhyme Syndicate Productions. It contains a sample from "Pusherman" by Curtis Mayfield.

Track listing

Side A
"I'm Your Pusher" (LP Version)
"I'm Your Pusher" (Instrumental)
"I'm Your Pusher" (A Capella)

Side B
"Girls L.G.B.N.A.F." (LP Version)
"Girls L.G.B.N.A.F." (Instrumental)
"Girls L.G.B.N.A.F." (A Capella)

Uses in pop culture
In 1989, the song was used in the beginning of the Season Two episode of the television series Midnight Caller entitled "Take Back the Streets".

Music video
The music video was released in 1988 and features cameos by Big Daddy Kane and Kool DJ Red Alert.

Charts

Weekly charts

References

1988 singles
Ice-T songs
Songs about drugs
Songs written by Curtis Mayfield
Songs written by Ice-T
1988 songs
Songs written by Afrika Islam